Domazan is a commune in the Gard department in southern France.

Population

See also
Communes of the Gard department

References

Communes of Gard